Agha Hasan Amanat ("آغا حسن "امانت, b. 1815, d. 1858) was an Indian Urdu poet, writer and playwright of the nineteenth century from the city of Lucknow. He was affiliated with the court of Wajid Ali Shah, the princely ruler of Awadh. His name was Agha Hasan Ali, while "Amanat" was his nom de plume (or takhallus). He is also referred to as Amanat Lakhnavi (i.e. Amanat of Lucknow) and Mirza Amanat.

Personal history
Agha Hasan Amanat was descended from a family of Iranian immigrants who moved to Lucknow in 1815. His father's name was Syed Ali Mashhadi, He was resident of Iran. He had two sons 
 Syed Agha Hasan Fasahat
 Syed Agha Hasan Latafat

Works
Amanat's compositions and works include the first stage play in the Urdu language, Inder Sabha. He is also credited with beginning the geet tradition in Urdu.

See also

Inder Sabha
Wajid Ali Shah

References

Urdu-language poets from India
Urdu theatre
Indian male poets
19th-century Indian Muslims
Writers from Lucknow
1815 births
1858 deaths
19th-century Indian poets
19th-century Indian dramatists and playwrights
Indian male dramatists and playwrights
Poets from Uttar Pradesh
19th-century Indian male writers
Dramatists and playwrights from Uttar Pradesh